The National Institute of Immovable Cultural Heritage is a government organization under the Ministry of Culture of Bulgaria which performs scientific and administrative duties related to the preservation of buildings and sites ("immovable property") as parts of Bulgarian cultural heritage. It maintains the national public register of immovable objects of cultural value of national and global importance.

References

External links 

 Official website
 List of national cultural objects of value by oblast

Heritage organizations
Government of Bulgaria